Walker Hall, or variants thereof, may refer to:

United States
Note these are listed on the National Register of Historic Places or are contributing properties.
 Walker Hall (Gainesville, Florida)
 Walker Memorial Hall, Bridgton, Maine, listed on the NRHP in Cumberland County, Maine
 Walker Hall (Spartanburg, South Carolina), listed on the NRHP in Spartanburg County, South Carolina

See also
Walker Building (disambiguation)
Walker House (disambiguation)